Andrzej Władysław Jarosik (born 26 November 1944) is a former Polish footballer who played as a forward.

Club career
Born in Sosnowiec, Jarosik started his career in Zagłębie Sosnowiec (1958–1974) and then played for in France with Racing Strasbourg (1974–1976) and SC Toulon (1976–1977). He was a two time scoring champion in the Polish first league, in 1970 with 18 goals and in 1971 with 13 goals.

International career
Jarosik earned 25 caps scoring 11 goals for the Poland national team, having made his debut in 1965 against Bulgaria national football team. His last appearance for the national team was in 1972 also against Bulgaria. He qualified for the Olympic squad in Munich (1972) and won the gold medal. In the game against the Soviet Union he refused to take the pitch because his displeasure of starting the game on the bench. His place was taken by Zygfryd Szołtysik (who ended up scoring a goal).

Personal life
After finishing his career as a player Jarosik, along with his family left for France where he currently lives and runs his business.

References

External links
 

1944 births
Living people
Sportspeople from Silesian Voivodeship
Association football forwards
Polish footballers
Poland international footballers
Polish expatriate footballers
People from Sosnowiec
Ekstraklasa players
Ligue 1 players
Zagłębie Sosnowiec players
RC Strasbourg Alsace players
SC Toulon players
Footballers at the 1972 Summer Olympics
Olympic gold medalists for Poland
Olympic footballers of Poland
Expatriate footballers in France
Medalists at the 1972 Summer Olympics